Sergei Bogdanov may refer to:
 Sergei Bogdanov (FSB spokesman), see Liberation Army of Dagestan
 Sergei Dmitriyevich Bogdanov (born 1977), Russian footballer
 Sergey Bogdanov (rower) (born 1983), Uzbekistani rower who participated in the Olympics